Blount County is the name of two counties in the United States:
 Blount County, Alabama
 Blount County, Tennessee